Jared Dovan Anderson (born November 16, 1999) is an American professional boxer who held the NABF Junior heavyweight title in 2021. As an amateur he won the 2017 and 2018 U.S. National Championships.

Professional career
Anderson signed a multi-year promotional contract with Bob Arum's Top Rank on September 24, 2019, and made his professional debut a month later on October 26, scoring a first-round knockout (KO) victory over Daniel Infante at the Reno-Sparks Convention Center in Reno, Nevada.

Anderson faced Andrew Satterfield in his third professional fight, which he won by a first-round technical knockout. On June 9, 2020, Anderson beat Johnnie Langston by a third-round technical knockout. It was the first time that Anderson had fought past the first round. Anderson scored another first-round stoppage on July 16, 2020, when he beat Hector Perez. Anderson passed the first round for the second time in his career on September 5, 2020, against Rodney Hernandez, whom he beat by a fourth-round technical knockout. Anderson closed out 2020 with a first-round technical knockout of Luis Peña on October 31, 2020.

Anderson was scheduled to face Kingsley Ibeh on February 13, 2021, and won his first fight of 2021 by a sixth-round knockout. Anderson next faced Jeremiah Karpency on April 10, 2021, and once again won by a knockout, stopping Karpency early in the second round. Anderson improved to 10–0 when he beat the previously undefeated Vladimir Tereshkin (22–0–1) on October 9, 2021 on the undercard of Tyson Fury vs. Deontay Wilder III via second-round technical knockout. Anderson was scheduled to face Oleksandr Teslenko on December 11, 2021, on the undercard of the Vasiliy Lomachenko and Richard Commey lightweight bout. He won the bout via second-round technical knockout.

Anderson returned on August, 27th 2022 on the undercard of Jose Pedraza vs Richard Commey to face Miljan Rovcanin. He won the fight by knockout in the 2nd round. Anderson was scheduled to face veteran Jerry Forrest on December, 10th 2022 at Madison Square Garden, in New York City, New York. He won the fight by knockout in the 2nd round.

Professional boxing record

References

Living people
1999 births
American male boxers
Sportspeople from Toledo, Ohio
Boxers from Ohio
Heavyweight boxers
African-American boxers